The dry-bulb temperature (DBT) is the temperature of air measured by a thermometer freely exposed to the air, but shielded from radiation and moisture.  DBT is the temperature that is usually thought of as air temperature, and it is the true thermodynamic temperature. It is directly proportional to the mean kinetic energy of the air molecules. Temperature is usually measured in degrees Celsius (°C), kelvins (K), or degrees Fahrenheit (°F).

Unlike wet-bulb temperature, dry bulb temperature does not indicate the amount of moisture in the air. In construction, it is an important consideration when designing a building for a certain climate.  Nall called it one of "the most important climate variables for human comfort and building energy efficiency."

DBT is an important variable in psychrometrics, being the horizontal axis of a psychrometric chart.

See also 
 Psychrometric chart
 Hygrometer
 Atmospheric thermodynamics

References 

Atmospheric thermodynamics

es:Temperatura#Temperatura seca